The Almighty (or "God Almighty") is an Abrahamic term for God.

Almighty may also refer to:

People and organizations
Almighty (rapper), a Cuban/Puerto Rican raised Latin trap rapper and singer
Almighty Saints, a street gang active in Chicago
Almighty Voice, a lacrosse player who competed in the 1904 Olympics

Music
The Almighty (band), a Scottish rock band formed in 1988
The Almighty (album), a 2000 self-titled album by The Almighty
"Almighty", a song by Gunna from his 2018 mixtape Drip Season 3
Almighty Defenders, a German gospel band formed in 2009
Almighty Records Ltd, a Hi-NRG remix and music producing company based in London, UK

Other uses
Almighty (Oh My Goddess!), a character in the manga and anime series Oh My Goddess!
Almighty dollar, an idiom often used to satirize an obsession for material wealth, or with capitalism in general

See also
Mighty (disambiguation)
Omnipotence, the quality of having unlimited power and potential